Tefibazumab (named Aurexis but not approved) is a humanized monoclonal antibody for the treatment of severe infections with Staphylococcus aureus. Possible indications include the treatment of S. aureus in a phase 2a patients with cystic fibrosis and of methicillin-resistant S. aureus.

It was developed by Inhibitex.

See also 
 MSCRAMM (microbial surface components recognizing adhesive matrix molecules)

References 

Monoclonal antibodies
Experimental drugs